Mount Pisgah Benevolence Cemetery is an African-American cemetery in Romney, West Virginia, United States. The cemetery is located along the Northwestern Turnpike (U.S. Route 50) below Indian Mound Cemetery overlooking Sulphur Spring Run. Historically known as the Romney Colored Cemetery and more recently as the Romney African-American Cemetery, the cemetery was created for African-Americans in the South Branch Valley who were not permitted to be interred in the city's Indian Mound Cemetery. The cemetery has been in use since the early 19th century and continues to serve Romney's African-American community.

It is currently maintained by the Mount Pisgah United Methodist Church, from which it takes its name.

See also

 List of historic sites in Hampshire County, West Virginia
 Indian Mound Cemetery

References

External links
 
 
 
 Wayne McGahuey's Hampshire County Cemetery Project

African-American cemeteries
African-American history of West Virginia
Cemeteries in West Virginia
Northwestern Turnpike
Protected areas of Hampshire County, West Virginia
Romney, West Virginia